The Black Star of Africa is a black five-pointed star (★) symbolizing Africa in general and Ghana in particular. The Black Star Line, founded in 1919 by Marcus Garvey as part of the Back-to-Africa movement, modelled its name on that of the White Star Line, changing the colour from white to black to symbolise ownership by black people rather than white people. The black star became a symbol of Pan-Africanism and anti-colonialism. Described as the "Lodestar of African Freedom", the black star was used in 1957 by Theodosia Okoh in the design of the Flag of Ghana.

Ghana
Ghanaians have come to regard the Black Star as a specific symbol of Ghana rather than of Africa in general. As well as on the flag, the star appears on the coat of arms; on the Black Star Gate in Black Star Square in the capital, Accra; and on the Seat of State in Parliament, on which the President sits on ceremonial occasions. The Ghana national football team is nicknamed the "Black Stars".

Elsewhere
The Black Star was also in the flag of the African Party for the Independence of Guinea and Cape Verde (PAIGC) on which the Flag of Guinea-Bissau and the former Flag of Cape Verde were based. The Flag of São Tomé and Príncipe uses the same Pan-African colours with two black stars, one each for São Tomé and Príncipe. The flag of the short-lived Union of African States had three black stars, one for each member state. Black Star Industries, named after the Black Star Line, is a commercial venture associated with the U.S. African People's Socialist Party.

See also 

 Flags of Africa
 National symbol
 Flags with stars

References

Citations

Sources
 
 
 

Star symbols
Pan-Africanism
Symbols of Africa
National symbols of Ghana